LSCO can refer to:

 Light sweet crude oil.
 La2−xSrxCuO4, a high temperature superconductor
 Lanthanum strontium copper oxide
 Large-scale combat operations
 Lamar State College–Orange